Afro-Iranians are Iranian people of African Zanj heritage. Most Afro-Iranians are concentrated in the coastal provinces of Persian Gulf such as Hormozagan, Sistan and Baluchestan, Bushehr and Khuzestan.

History

During the Achaemenid era, its District XVII was composed of those described to be "Paricanians and Asiatic Ethiopians". 

The Indian Ocean slave trade was multi-directional and changed over time. To meet the demand for menial labor, black slaves captured by Arab slave traders were sold in cumulatively large numbers over centuries to; the Persian Gulf, Egypt, Arabia, India, the Far East, the Indian Ocean islands and Ethiopia.
Others came as immigrants throughout many millennia or from Portuguese slave traders who occupied most of the contested Ormus's Bandar Abbas, Hormoz and Qeshm island ports in southern Iran by early 16th century.

During Qajar rule, many wealthy households imported Black African women and children to perform domestic work alongside Eastern European Circassian slaves. This was largely drawn from the Zanj, who were Bantu-speaking peoples that lived alongside Southeast Africa. In an area roughly comprising modern-day Tanzania, Mozambique and Malawi. Under British pressure, Mohammad Shah Qajar issued a firman suppressing slave trade in 1848. 

Bandari music has strong influence from the Afro-Iranian community.

Notable Afro-Iranians 
 Abdolreza Barzegari, footballer
 Abdul Karim Farhani, Iranian Shia Cleric, Assembly of Experts Member
 Ali Firouzi, footballer and coach
 Mehrab Shahrokhi, footballer
 Mohammad Ali Mousavi Jazayeri, Iranians Shia Cleric, Assembly of Experts Member (Afro-Ahwazi Arab)
 Shanbehzadeh Ensemble, Iranian folk band
 Dennis Walker, footballer of Afro-Iranian descent, first black player to play for Manchester United

See also

Zanj 
Siddi, people of Zanj descent in Pakistan and India. 
Shirazi people, Bantu inhabiting the Swahili coast.
Afro-Arabs
Afro-Turks
Slavery in Iran
Haji Firuz,  fictional blackface character in Iranian folklore.

Further reading

 Ehsaei, Mahdi (2015) "Afro-Iran", Heidelberg: Kehrer Verlag, 
 "Unveiling the Veiled"
 "Re-imagining Iranian African Slavery: photography as material Culture"
 "Qajar African Nannies"
 "Out of Focus, Photography of African Slavery in Qajar Iran"
 "Photography of African Slavery in Iran"
/"The face of African slavery in Qajar Iran – in pictures"

References

External links
Afro-Iranian Lives (a documentary film by: Behnaz Mirzai)
Afro-Iran (an ethnographic photography project and book by: Mahdi Ehsaei)
Afro-Iranians through the Lens of Documentarists (Review of Behnaz Mirzais' documentaries by: Pedram Khosronejad)
A History of Slavery and Emancipation in Iran, 1800–1929 (Review of Behnaz Mirzai's Book by: Pedram Khosronejad)

African diaspora in Asia
Ethnic groups in Iran
People of African descent
African diaspora in the Middle East